Louis Riel is a three-act opera by composer Harry Somers to an English and French libretto by Mavor Moore and Jacques Languirand. Written for the 1967 Canadian Centennial and arguably that country's most famous opera to date, it portrays the titular Métis leader executed in 1885.

Performance history 
Louis Riel had its first performances at the O'Keefe Centre in Toronto 23 and 28 September and 11 October 1967 and at the Salle Wilfrid-Pelletier, Place des Arts, in Montreal 19 and 21 October 1967. Victor Feldbrill conducted, Leon Major directed, and Murray Laufer and Marie Day designed the sets and costumes. The original cast included Bernard Turgeon as Riel, Cornelis Opthof as John A. Macdonald, Joseph Rouleau as Monseigneur Taché, Patricia Rideout as Riel's mother, Mary Morrison as his sister Sara, Roxolana Roslak as his wife, Howell Glynne as William McDougall, and Remo Marinucci as Baptiste Lépine.

The libretto depicts the post-Confederation political events bounded by the Indian and Métis uprisings of 1869–70 (Red River Rebellion) and 1884–5 (North-West Rebellion) and the personal tragedy of the leader of the uprisings, the Manitoba schoolteacher and Métis hero Louis Riel. After the premiere, Kenneth Winters described the opera in the Toronto Telegram (25 September 1967) as a 'pastiche ... big, efficient, exciting, heterogeneous ... It had no ring of eternity but it was a vigorous harnessing of current and choice; a brash, smart, cool hand on the pulse of a number of fashions, social, dramatic and musical.' The production was repeated in 1968 in Toronto—six performances with the assistance of the Chalmers Foundation—and was adapted by Franz Kraemer in 1969 for CBC TV.

In 1975 Louis Riel was revived by the Canadian Opera Company for several performances, including one in Toronto, 27 September, honouring the International Music Council's 16th General Assembly; three (14, 16, and 18 October) at the National Arts Centre, Ottawa; and one (23 October, the U.S. premiere) at the Kennedy Center, Washington, D.C., as part of Canada's contribution to the United States' bicentennial celebrations. Wendell Margrave of the Washington Star described the opera as 'one of the most imaginative and powerful scores to have been written in this century.'

Using a broadcast tape from the 1975 US performance, Centrediscs produced a three-record set of the complete opera (CMC-24/25/2685-3), which was launched in November 1985 at the 'Image of Riel in Canadian Culture' conference in Guelph, Ontario. Feldbrill conducted the National Arts Centre Orchestra, Turgeon and Roslak repeated their roles, and were joined by Donald Rutherford (John A. Macdonald), Jean-Pierre Hurteau (Bishop Taché), Diane Loeb (Riel's mother), Ann Cooper (his sister), Ronald Bermingham (McDougall), and Remo Marinucci (Lépine).

'Kuyas'—the lullaby sung in Act III by Riel's wife to their child—was used prior to the opera's premiere as the test piece for the Montreal International Competition in 1967. It was recorded in 1983 by Roslak on Centrediscs CMC-1183.

Louis Riel was not presented again until Opera McGill gave the first full staging in 30 years, at Place des Arts, 27–28 January 2005, in celebration of the 100th anniversary of McGill University's music program. Riel was played by Luc Lalonde, Macdonald by Michael Meraw, and Bishop Taché by John Taylor; François Racine was stage director and Alexis Hauser, music director. The revival won an Opus Award as event of the year.

To coincide with the 150th anniversary of the confederation of Canada, the Canadian, a production of Louis Riel by the Canadian Opera Company and the National Arts Centre was performed from April 20 to May 13, 2017 at the Toronto Four Seasons Centre, and is scheduled for June 20 to June 27 at the Ottawa National Arts Centre.  Directed by Peter Hinton, this revival is the first COC opera to cast indigenous artists for indigenous roles.  The production features Michif, the Métis language, not included in the original production, and is set to split the opera chorus in two- the Parliamentary chorus, representing western settlers, and the Land Assembly Chorus, representing indigenous people directly affected by the victories and losses of Riel.

The 2017 cast includes Russell Braun as Riel, James Westman as John A. Macdonald, Alain Coulombe as Monseigneur Taché, Allyson McHardy as Riel's mother, Joanna Burt as Sara Riel, Simone Osbourne as Riel's wife, Doug MacNaughton as William McDougall, and Taras Chmil as Baptiste Lépine.

Roles
Roles at the 1967 premiere were:

References

External links 
 Louis Riel at The Canadian Encyclopedia

Music dramas
Operas
English-language operas
Tragédies en musique
1967 operas
French-language operas
Operas by Harry Somers
Operas set in Canada
Operas set in the 19th century
Cultural depictions of Louis Riel
Canadian Centennial
John A. Macdonald